The Subaru Elaion is a modified Subaru Forester which was built by Subaru and Elaion (Repsol-YPF) to compete between Argentina and Chile in the 2010 Dakar Rally.

The car has a carbon-fibre and Kevlar body, and has a  ground clearance.

Elaion

References

External links